White Station may refer to:

White Station, Mississippi, an unincorporated community located in Clay County
White Station, Memphis, Tennessee, an unincorporated area in Shelby County
White Station High School, in Memphis, Tennessee
White Station Middle School, in Memphis, Tennessee
White Station Tower, a high-rise office building in Memphis, Tennessee